Pterostylis bicornis, commonly known as the horned greenhood, is a plant in the orchid family Orchidaceae and is endemic to eastern Australia. Non-flowering plants have a rosette of leaves while flowering plants have a similar rosette at the base of a flowering spike with a one or two dark green, white and brown flowers. The flowers have distinctive long, thin horn-like tips.

Description
Pterostylis bicornis, is a terrestrial,  perennial, deciduous, herb with an underground tuber. Flowering occurs in June and July.

Taxonomy and naming
Pterostylis bicornis was first formally described in 1987 by David Jones and Mark Clements from a specimen collected on Mount Maroon. The description was published in Proceedings of the Royal Society of Queensland. The specific epithet (bicornis) is a Latin word meaning "two-horned".

Distribution and habitat
The horned greenhood grows in shallow soil pockets in rock crevices with moss and lichen. It is only known from Mount Maroon and the Mount Barney National Park in southern Queensland and from near Woodenbong in far northern New South Wales.

Conservation
Pterostylis bicornis is classified as "vulnerable" under the Australian Government Environment Protection and Biodiversity Conservation Act 1999 (EPBC Act). The main threats to the species are illegal collection, inappropriate fire regimes and weed invasion.

References

bicornis
Endemic orchids of Australia
Orchids of New South Wales
Orchids of Queensland
Plants described in 1987